"Italian Love Song" is a pop song written by Tina Arena, Francesco De Benedittis, Davide Esposito and Paul Manners, produced by Manners for Arena's sixth album Greatest Hits 1994-2004 (2004). The song was released as a single in Australia on 5 November 2004 but failed to make a major impact on the Australian ARIA Singles Chart peaking at number thirty-three and spending two weeks in the top fifty.

Included on the single is "Take Me Apart" which is the only other new track featured on her greatest hits album and a previously unreleased remix of "Dare You to Be Happy", a single from her album Just Me (2001). 
The song also features a music video clip shot by Australian director Anthony Rose in a small fishing village in Southern France.

Writing
In the inside cover of her 2004 greatest hits album, Arena states:

Track listing
"Italian Love Song" – 3:51
"Take Me Apart" (Fiona Kernaghan) – 4:02
"Dare You to Be Happy" (remix) (Arena, Peter-John Vettese) – 4:34

Charts

References

2004 singles
Tina Arena songs
2004 songs
Songs written by Tina Arena